Angel of Sodom is a thrash metal band that originated out of Helsinki, Finland. The band was created in 2009, founded by Eero Tertsunen, who also performs in Renascent, and Michael Majalahti. The band has released one studio album in 2015 and an EP in 2016. In 2016, the band went on a hiatus, due to Tertsunen moving to Bloomington, Indiana in the United States.

History
The project was created by Eero Tertsunen on guitars and Michael Majalahti on vocals. Majalahti and Tertsunen began writing new music and over the course of several years, eventually wrote and recorded a full-length album, which was titled Divine Retribution, which was very well received. The album featured Rolf Pilve of Stratovarius on drums. Following the album, however, the band hoped to perform live and Pilve was unable to commit to live performances, leading them to hire on Joonas Heikkinen.

Tertsunen had performed with Heikkinen in a brutal death metal band called Kremator in the early 2000s, with Heikkinen later joining Tertsunen's band Renascent as the official drummer. In April 2, 2016, the band recorded an EP titled Heavens Ablaze, which featured two songs. In 2016, Tertsunen announced that he would be moving to Bloomington, Indiana in the United States, and the band would no longer be able to perform live. However, he returned to play two final live shows in July that year, with the band hiring on Jonne Kytölä to perform bass. The band is currently inactive, while the members continue on with their individual efforts, with Majalahti to continue working in his wrestling career as "StarBuck", Tertsunen joining the blackened death metal band Symphony of Heaven, and Heikkinen briefly performed with the black metal band Temple of Perdition.

Members
Current

Live

Session

Discography
Studio albums
Divine Retribution (2015)

EPs
Heavens Ablaze (2016)

External links
Angel of Sodom on ReverbNation

References

Musical groups established in 2010
Finnish thrash metal musical groups
Musical groups from Helsinki
2010 establishments in Finland